The Centre of Excellence for Operations in Confined and Shallow Waters (COE CSW) is an international military organization founded to support NATO's transformation program. As part of the NATO Centres of Excellence programme the COE CSW was established in April 2007 and officially accredited by NATO on 26 May 2009. It is co-located with the staff of the German Einsatzflottille 1 in Kiel whose commander is double-hatted as COE CSW Director.

Confined and Shallow Waters (CSW) 
Confined and shallow waters are a cramped, congested and contested operational environment that is characterised by complexity, interaction, surprise, speed, disguise plus a diversity of actors. Furthermore, the rapid as well as unpredictable change of conditions and circumstances, including the frequent shift of tactical advantage from one side to another, is typical.
With these attributes, these waters constitutes an extremely challenging littoral battlespace which affects the freedom of movement and action by specific geographical and geophysical factors as well as manifold threats and risks. On the other side, CSW also offers a broad range of possibilities and opportunities for military operations.
Principally being a maritime sphere, CSW is a theatre of operations also being significantly interrelated with the other military domains (air, land, space and cyber). Consequently, the greatest possible joint interaction takes place in CSW involving all major military components and services.

Mission and task 
As a hub of knowledge, COE CSW develops or provides contributions to doctrines, concepts and procedures. Part of the business is the conduction of experiments and analyses, the provision of competence for NATO initiatives, projects, exercises and operations. Furthermore, COE CSW works on a range of projects related to operations in CSW that are initiated by specific 'Requests for Support'.

The work of the COE CSW is usually initiated through a Request for Support by a NATO entity or a participating nation. The annual Programme of Work contains various 'Projects', which have a customer and defined product with a clear end date and end state, and a number of 'Activities', which cover the permanent support to NATO Transformation. Furthermore, the COE CSW plans and conducts work related events like conferences and workshops.

Work environment 
Since the NATO COEs are set up as think tanks, they do not focus only on the military, but also co-operate closely with other governmental as well as non-governmental organizations, maritime-oriented institutions, academics, and economy.
Among the partners of the COE CSW are:

 The Allied Maritime Command (MARCOM) in Northwood, UK
 The Combined Joint Operations from the Sea Center of Excellence in Norfolk, USA
 The Naval Mine Warfare COE in Ostend, Belgium
 The Maritime Security COE in Aksaz, Turkey
 The Centre for Maritime Research and Experimentation (CMRE) in La Spezia, Italy
 The Bundeswehr Technical Centre for Ships and Naval Weapons (WTD 71) in Eckernförde, Germany
 The Sea Surveillance Cooperation Baltic Sea (SUCBAS)
 The Institute for Security Policy Kiel (ISPK) in Kiel, Germany
 Defence industry and maritime commerce

Participants 
Germany acts as 'Framework Nation' for COE CSW providing the infrastructure, basic services, financial contributions and core staff personnel as well as a number of "Subject Matter Experts". 
Upon the foundation of COE CSW, Greece, the Netherlands, and Turkey acceded as sponsoring nations providing "Subject Matter Experts" and financial contributions. In 2009 Poland and in 2014 Italy also joined as Sponsoring Nations.
NATO COEs are open for NATO partners in terms of providing Subject Matter Expertise and financial contributions. In 2011, COE CSW welcomed Finland, the first "Contributing Nation" to a NATO COE.
Finally, the United States of America is participating in the COE CSW through the 'Personnel Exchange Program' with the German Navy. From 2011 to 2019, the Republic of Finland supported the COE CSW, being the first Contributing Partner to a NATO COE ever.

Structure 
The supervisory board of COE CSW is the 'Steering Committee' composed of a chairman (allocated by the Framework Nation but, without a vote) and a representative of each participating nation (each having one vote). The Steering Committee monitors the work progress and approves the annual report and budget.
The COE CSW is led by a Director with the rank of Rear admiral (lh) who at the same time is double-hatted as commander of the German Flotilla 1. The Executive Director, a navy captain, is responsible for daily operations. The staff of Flotilla 1 assists with administrative issues such as security and logistics.
In 2015, the COE CSW implemented a new working structure. Consisting of three branches, the structure clearly differentiates between productive work and supporting management functions:
 Concept and Doctrine Development (CD) - production
 Training and Analysis (TA) - production
 Staff Organisation and External Relations (SE) - management

The sections IT and AS (Administrative Support) are allocated to the Staff Organisation and External Relations branch, the Financial Control section is directly subordinated to the Executive Director.

Literature
 Buss, Heinz Georg: COE CSW - Avantgarde im NATO-Transformationsprozess; in: Marineforum 11-2015 p. 4 ff
 Buss, Heinz Georg; Riewesell, Stefan: Maritime C-IED and Harbour Protection: A Joint Effort; in: The Transformer Fall 2013 Vol 9 Issue 2 p. 18
 Stricker, Hans-Joachim: Centre of Excellence for Operations in Confined and Shallow Waters COE CSW - Das COE als Ausdruck unserer besonderen nationalen Fähigkeiten im Bündnis; in: Marineforum 6-2007 p. 3 f
 Weber, Fritz-Rudolf: Centre of Excellence for Operations in Confined and Shallow Waters - Think Tank für die NATO; in: Marineforum 1/2-2010 p. 11 ff
 Wiedemann, Jan: COE CSW celebrates fifth anniversary; in: NAVAL FORCES III/2014 p. 90 f
 Wilson, Brian: Five maritime security developments that will resonate for a generation; in: Harvard Law School National Security Journal; 2015-03-11

References

External links 
 Official website of the COE CSW

NATO agencies
Organizations established in 2007